Oliver Rendell Arton (29 March 1916 or 1920 – 4 February 2011) was a Bermudian banker and politician who served as a justice of the peace and member of the Parliament of Bermuda. He was born in Hamilton, Bermuda, the son of Dr. Ogilvie Airlie Arton and Isabel Rendell, and educated in Toronto. He was one of the founders of the United Bermuda Party. Arton died on 4 February 2011.

References 

Year of birth uncertain
2011 deaths
Bermudian justices of the peace
Members of the Parliament of Bermuda
People from Hamilton, Bermuda
United Bermuda Party politicians